The 168th Air Refueling Squadron is a unit of the Alaska Air National Guard 168th Air Refueling Wing located at Eielson Air Force Base, Fairbanks, Alaska. The 168th is equipped with the KC-135R Stratotanker.

History

World War II
Activated in mid-1942 as a B-26 Marauder medium bombardment group. Trained under Third Air Force in Louisiana; reassigned to the European Theater of Operations (ETO), being assigned initially to VIII Air Support Command in England in September 1942. Flew several missions over France and Belgium from its base in England during October, then being reassigned to the new Twelfth Air Force in Algeria.

During the North African campaign, engaged in tactical bomb strikes of enemy targets, primarily in eastern Algeria and Tunisia, including railroads, airfields, harbor installations, and enemy shipping along the Mediterranean Coast.

Squadron returned to French Morocco in March 1943, then returned to combat in June 1943, attacking enemy targets on Italian island in the Mediterranean, including Sicily, Sardinia, and Pantelleria. From bases in Algeria and Tunisia, the group supported the Allied invasion of Italy, bombing bridges and marshalling yards during the late summer and early autumn of 1943.

In November, it moved to Sardinia, to strike Axis targets in central Italy. Early in 1944, the squadron supported Allied ground forces as they advanced in the Cassino and Anzio areas. Later in the year, the group attacked German supply lines in northern Italy, bombing bridges, marshalling yards, and roads. During the summer, it bombed bridges over the Po River in northern Italy to block the stream of German supplies and reinforcements going southward. Supported the invasion of southern France in August 1944 by attacking coastal batteries, radar stations, and bridges. From Corsica, it hit railroad bridges in Northern Italy and late in the year attacked railroad lines through the Brenner Pass that connected Germany and Austria with Italy.

In January 1945, the squadron returned to the United States, where it began to train with A-26 aircraft for operations in the Pacific Theater. Between May and July 1945, moved by ship to Okinawa, and on 16 July flew its first mission against Japan. From then until the end of the fighting in early August, the squadron attacked enemy targets such as airfields and industrial centers on Kyūshū and occupied Shanghai area of China, and shipping around the Ryukyu Islands and in the East China Sea. In November and December 1945, the squadron returned to the United States and was inactivated.

Illinois Air National Guard
The wartime 437th Bombardment Squadron was re-designated as the 168th Bombardment Squadron, and was allotted to the Illinois Air National Guard, on 24 May 1946. It was organized at Orchard Place Airport, Chicago, Illinois, and was extended federal recognition on 19 October 1947 by the National Guard Bureau.  The 168th Bombardment Squadron was bestowed the lineage, history, honors, and colors of the 437th Bombardment Squadron and all predecessor units. The squadron was equipped with B-26 Invaders and was assigned to the Illinois ANG 126th Bombardment Group, operationally gained by Tactical Air Command.

Korean War activation
On 1 April 1951 the 168th was federalized and brought to active-duty due to the Korean War. It was initially assigned to Tactical Air Command (TAC), and moved to Langley AFB, Virginia.  At Langley, the 168th Bombardment Squadron was assigned to the federalized 126th Bombardment Group, equipped with B-26 Invaders.  The 126th Bomb Group consisted of the 168th, along with the 108th and the 168th Bombardment Squadrons from the Illinois ANG.  The aircraft were marked by various color bands on the vertical stabilizer and rudder. Black/Yellow/Blue for the 108th; Black/Yellow/Red for the 168th, and Black/Yellow/Green for the 180th.

After training and organization, the 126th Bombardment Wing was reassigned to the United States Air Forces in Europe and deployed to Bordeaux-Merignac Air Base, France with the first elements arriving in November 1951.  By 10 November, Bordeaux was considered an operational base and was assigned to the 12th Air Force.  It flew B-26's for training and maneuvers and stayed at Bordeaux AB until being transferred Laon-Couvron Air Base, France on 25 May 1952.

At Laon, the 126th used its B-26's for training and maneuvers until December until being relieved from active duty and transferred, without personnel and equipment, back to the United States where the unit was returned to the control of the Air National Guard on 1 January 1953.

Cold War inactivation
After returning from France, was re-equipped with F-51D Mustangs due to the limited availability of jets which were being used by the USAF in the Korean War.  In early 1955, was upgraded to new F-84F Thunderstreak jet fighters.

The squadron was ordered inactivated 31 May 1958 due to budget restrictions.

Alaska Air National Guard
In 1986 the 168th Fighter-Interceptor Squadron was transferred from the Illinois ANG to the Alaska Air National Guard.  It was re-designated as the 168th Air Refueling Squadron, extended federal recognition and reactivated on 1 October 1986.  The lineage, history and honors of the 168th FIS and all previous designations were bestowed on the 168th ARS.

The reactivated squadron was assigned to the Alaska ANG 176th Composite Group at Elmendorf AFB. The 168th would operate as a geographically separated unit (GSU), at Eielson Air Force Base, Fairbanks.  It was equipped with KC-135E Stratotankers and assumed an air refueling mission. The first commanding officer of the squadron was Ltc. William "Doug" Clinton. The first rendezvous and refueling of the squadron occurred just weeks after the arrival of the first aircraft. The pilot in command was Ltc. Tom Gresch and the navigator conducting the rendezvous was Capt. Michael R. Stack, formerly of the 126th Air Refueling Wing, Illinois Air National Guard. For the next four years the squadron would provide air refueling support for the 6th Strategic Wing and all other tactical and strategic units in Alaska and PACAF. In addition, because of Alaska's strategic geographical location, the 168th supported air refueling operations for USAFE.

On 1 July 1990, the 168th was authorized to expand to a group level, and the 168th Air Refueling Group established by the National Guard Bureau. The 168th AREFS becoming the group's flying squadron.  It also changed equipment to the KC-135D Stratotanker.  Shortly afterward, on 9 August, Alaskan Air Command was inactivated and the group came under Eleventh Air Force, Pacific Air Forces.

In 1992, the 168th Group was changed in status to a wing, the 168th Air Refueling Squadron being assigned to the new 168th Operations Group.  In January 1994 and again in January 1996, the 168 ARW received the Air Force Outstanding Unit Award for exceptionally meritorious service both in the Alaskan and Southwest Asian theaters for the periods of 8 January 1991 to 7 January 1993 and 8 January 1993 to June 1995

Lineage
 Constituted as the 437th Bombardment Squadron (Medium) on 19 June 1942
 Activated on 26 June 1942
 Redesignated 437th Bombardment Squadron, Mediumm, c. 1944
 Redesignated 437th Bombardment Squadron, Light on 3 February 1945
 Inactivated on 4 January 1946
 Redesignated 168th Bombardment Squadron'['', Light and allotted to the National Guard on 24 May 1946
 Activated on 21 August 1947
 Extended federal recognition on 19 October 1947
 Federalized and ordered to active service on 1 April 1951
 Released from active service, returned to state control and redesignated 168th Fighter-Bomber Squadronon 1 January 1953
 Activated c. 1 May 1953
 Redesignated 168th Fighter-Interceptor Squadron on 1 July 1955
 Inactivated on 31 May 1958
 Withdrawn from the Illinois Air National Guard and allotted to the Alaska Air National Guard, 1986
 Redesignated 168th Air Refueling Squadron, Heavy on 1 October 1986
 Activated and extended federal recognition on 25 October 1986
 Redesignated 168th Air Refueling Squadron''' on 15 March 1992

Assignments
 319th Bombardment Group, 26 June 1942
 VII Bomber Command, 18 December 1945 – 4 January 1946
 126th Bombardment Group (later 126th Composite Group, 126th Bombardment Group), 19 October 1947 – 1 January 1953
 126th Fighter Bomber Group (later 126th Fighter Interceptor Group), 1 January 1953 – 31 May 1958
 Alaska Air National Guard, 1 October 1986
 176th Composite Group, 25 October 1986
 168th Air Refueling Group, 1 July 1990
 168th Operations Group, 1 June 1992 – present

Stations

 Barksdale Field, Louisiana, 26 June 1942
 Harding Field, Louisiana, 8–27 August 1942
 RAF Shipdham (USAAF Station 115), England, 12 September 1942
 RAF Horsham St Faith (USAAF Station 123), England, c. 4 October 1942
 Saint-Leu Airfield, Algeria, c. 11 November 1942
 Oran Tafaraoui Airport, Algeria, 18 November 1942
 Maison Blanche Airport, Algeria, 24 November 1942
 Telergma Airfield, Algeria, c. 12 December 1942
 Oujda Airfield, French Morocco, 3 March 1943
 Rabat-Salé Airport, French Morocco, 25 April 1943
 Sedrata Airfield, Algeria, 1 June 1943
 Djedeida Airfield, Tunisia, 26 June 1943

 Decimomannu Airfield, Sardinia, c. 1 November 1943
 Serragia Airfield, Corsica, c. 21 September 1944 – 1 January 1945
 Bradley Field, Connecticut, 25 January 1945
 Columbia Army Air Base, South Carolina, c. 28 February–27 April 1945
 Kadena Airfield, Okinawa, c. 2 July 1945
 Machinato-Naha Airfield, Okinawa, 21 July–21 November 1945
 Fort Lawton, Washington, 17–18 December 1945
 Orchard Place Airport (Later O’Hare IAP), Illinois, 19 October 1947
 Langley Air Force Base, Virginia, c. 25 July 1951 – c. 19 November 1951
 Bordeaux-Mérignac Air Base, France, November 1951
 Laon-Couvron Air Base, France, c. 25 May 1952 – 1 January 1953
 O’Hare IAP, Illinois, c. 1 May 1953 – 31 May 1958
 Eielson Air Force Base, Alaska, 1 October 1986 – present

Aircraft

 B-26 Marauder, 1942–1944
 B-25 Mitchell, 1944–1945
 A-26 Invader, 1945–1946
 B-26 Invader, 1947–1954
 F-51D Mustang, 1953–1955
 F-84F Thunderstreak, 1955–1957

 F-86L Sabre Interceptor, 1957–1958
 KC-135E Stratotanker, 1986–1990
 KC-135D Stratotanker, 1990–1995
 KC-135R Stratotanker, 1995 – present

Operations and decorations
 Combat Operations: World War II
 Campaigns: Algeria-French Morocco, with Arrowhead; Tunisia; Sicily; Naples-Foggia; Anzio; Rome-Arno; Southern France; North Apennines; Air Combat, EAME Theater; Air Offensive, Japan; Ryukyus; China Offensive. Western Pacific; Leyte; Luzon; Southern Philippines; Ryukyus
 Decorations:
 Distinguished Unit Citations: Rome, Italy, 3 Mar 1944; Florence, Italy, 11 Mar 1944
 French Croix de Guerre with Palm; Apr, May and Jun 1944.

References

Notes

Bibliography

External links
168th Air Refueling Wing (official site)
Eielson Air Force Base
Alaska Air National Guard

Squadrons of the United States Air National Guard
Military units and formations in Alaska
Air refueling squadrons of the United States Air Force